Rugaylat is a suburb of the city of Fujairah in the United Arab Emirates (UAE). The site of a small port, the area has seen a number of drownings of unwary swimmers.

References 

Populated places in the Emirate of Fujairah